Vrhek is a settlement in the Municipality of Sevnica in east central Slovenia. It lies in the hills above the left bank of the Mirna River southeast of Krmelj. The area is part of the historical region of Lower Carniola. The municipality is now included in the Lower Sava Statistical Region.

References

External links
Vrhek at Geopedia

Populated places in the Municipality of Sevnica